The Feyenoord Tournament was a friendly pre season football tournament that took place between 1978 and 1991.The tournament was held by the famous Dutch giants Feyenoord and 3 other invited teams. All the games were played at the Feijenoord Stadion, Rotterdam which is the home stadium of Feyenoord.

Winners

Details

1981 Tournament

Semi Final (31/07/1981)

 Dukla Prague 3 - 1  RSC Anderlecht
 Celtic FC 2 - 1  Feyenoord

Third Place Match (02/08/1981)

 RSC Anderlecht 1 - 1  Feyenoord (5-4 pen)

Final (02/08/1981)

 Celtic FC 2 - 1  Dukla Prague

1982 Tournament

Semi Final (06/08/1982)

 Celtic FC1 4 - 0  FK Austria Wien
 Feyenoord 2 - 0  Arsenal FC

Third Place Match (08/08/1982)

 FK Austria Wien 4 - 0  Arsenal FC

Final (08/08/1982)

 Feyenoord 4 - 3  Celtic FC

1 Celtic FC were invited to the tournament again as they were the holders of the trophy.

References
http://www.thecelticwiki.com/page/Feyenoord+Tournament

Feyenoord
Dutch football friendly trophies